Lalita Shastri (born Lalmani Devi; 11 January 1910 – 13 April 1993) was the wife of Prime Minister of India, Lal Bahadur Shastri.  

Lalita Devi was from Mirzapur in Uttar Pradesh. She married Lal Bahadur Shastri on 16 May 1928. After marriage, the couple lived for several years in Allahabad before moving to Lucknow and then to New Delhi. Lal Bahadur Shastri spent nine years of his life in jail. During these spells, Lalita looked after the children and household. The family moved to New Delhi in 1952 when Shastri became the railway minister. However they vacated the premises after his death. But in 1968, then Prime Minister Indira Gandhi allotted the house to Lalita Shastri, the wife of Lal Bahadur Shastri, and she lived there till her death in 1993.

Today Lal Bhadur Shastri Memorial run by Lal Bahadur Shastri National Memorial Trust, is situated next to 10 Janpath the official residence of her husband as prime minister, at 1, Motilal Nehru Place, New Delhi.

She founded the Shastri Sewa Niketan. Her son Sunil Shastri is its present chairman. Lalita Shastri died in 1993 in New Delhi. Anil Shastri, one of her sons, is a former Lok Sabha member.

An epic poetry book in Hindi titled Lalita Ke Aansoo written by Krant M. L. Verma was published in 1978. In this book the complete story of her husband Lal Bahadur Shastri has been narrated by Lalita Shastri. Lalita herself wrote verse on occasion, and a few songs written by her (such as "भोला भोला रटते रटते") were set to tune by Chitragupta and sung by Lata Mangeshkar.

References 

Spouses of prime ministers of India
People from Mirzapur
1910 births
1993 deaths